2008 in Ghana details events of note that happened in the Ghana in the year 2008.

Incumbents
 President: John Kufuor
 Vice President: Aliu Mahama
 Chief Justice: Georgina Theodora Wood

Events

January

February
20th - U.S. President George Bush arrives in Ghana for an official visit.

March

April

May

June

July

August

September

October

November

December

7 December - Presidential and parliamentary election held.
28 December - John Atta Mills wins presidential run off.

Concerts

Television

National holidays
Holidays in italics are "special days", while those in regular type are "regular holidays".
 January 1: New Year's Day
 March 6: Independence Day
 April 22 Good Friday
 May 1: Labor Day
 December 25: Christmas
 December 26: Boxing Day

In addition, several other places observe local holidays, such as the foundation of their town. These are also "special days."

References